There have been two TV series of The Day of the Triffids:

The Day of the Triffids (1981 TV series)
The Day of the Triffids (2009 TV series)